LY-503430 is an AMPA receptor positive allosteric modulator developed by Eli Lilly.

LY-503430 produces both nootropic and neuroprotective effects, reducing brain damage caused by 6-hydroxydopamine or MPTP and also increasing levels of the neurotrophic factor BDNF in the brain, particularly in the substantia nigra, hippocampus, and striatum. It is orally active and the main application it is currently being developed for is treatment of Parkinson's disease, although it has also been proposed to be useful in the treatment of Alzheimer's disease, depression, and schizophrenia.

See also 
 AMPA receptor positive allosteric modulator

References 

AMPA receptor positive allosteric modulators
Benzamides
Eli Lilly and Company brands
Experimental drugs
Organofluorides
Sulfonamides